Civic List may refer to:
 Civic List (Italy), a party list presented at an Italian local election which has no official connection with a national political party and which campaigns on local issues
 Civic List (Montenegro), a political list in Montenegro
 Civic List (Slovenia), a political party in Slovenia